The Tusk Tour was a world concert tour by the rock group, Fleetwood Mac. The tour began on October 26, 1979, in Pocatello, Idaho and ended on September 1, 1980, in Hollywood, California. The Live album contained many of the live recordings of songs from The Tusk Tour.

History of the tour
In 1979, Fleetwood Mac embarked on their 112 show-long world tour promoting their new album, Tusk.  Beginning in Pocatello, Idaho on October 26, 1979, and ending September 1, 1980 at the Hollywood Bowl, the roller-coaster tour was near-detrimental to the survival of the band. In order to provide a cheaper option after the million dollars of expenses blown on the tour itself, every one of their shows performed were filmed and recorded for their Live album.

Setbacks
On top of this tour being excessively expensive it was also physically and mentally exhausting for the band members- and these two setbacks together were a recipe for disaster. As Christine McVie, singer-songwriter and keyboardist in the band puts it, "Somebody once said that with the money we spent on champagne on one night they could have made an entire album", she later recalls, "I used to go onstage and drink a bottle of Dom Pérignon, and drink one offstage afterwards . It's not the kind of party I’d like to go to now. There was a lot of booze being drunk and there was blood floating around in the alcohol, which doesn’t make for a stable environment." On top of all the drinking, the band members indulged in heavy amounts of cocaine and marijuana and McVie even jokes that the strength of the marijuana was so strong that the actual act of smoking it was not needed- it only needed to be blown in her face and she would feel the effects.  With all the substance abuse the band members endured atop all the stress, the tour was not only disadvantageous, but also extremely unhealthy.

As the tour progressed, the band members became less and less fond of each other and as a result of this tension as well as the financial setbacks endured, the band nearly parted ways as explained in Uncut'''s article, "Fleetwood Mac: 'Everybody was pretty weirded out' – the story of Rumours''", by the end of the tour the band members were "barely able to stand the sight of each other".  While in Auckland, New Zealand in 1980, Stevie Nicks was physically and emotionally attacked by fellow band member Lindsey Buckingham. She explains that he began to mimic her by pulling his jacket up over his head to mirror what she did stylistically with her shawl, but she ignored his provoking gestures.

Tour dates

Set lists

North American leg 1979 #1
 "Say You Love Me"
 "The Chain"
 "Dreams"
 "Not That Funny"
 "Rhiannon"
 "Over and Over"
 "Oh Well"
 "Sara"
 "What Makes You Think You're The One"
 "Oh Daddy"
 "Save Me a Place"
 "Landslide"
 "Tusk"
 "Angel"
 "You Make Loving Fun"
 "I'm So Afraid"
 "World Turning"
 "Go Your Own Way"
 "Sisters of the Moon"
 "Blue Letter"
 "Songbird"

North American leg 1979 #2
 "Say You Love Me"
 "The Chain"
 "Dreams"
 "Not That Funny"
 "Rhiannon"
 "Don't Stop"
 "Oh Well"
 "Sara"
 "What Makes You Think You're The One"
 "Oh Daddy"
 "Save Me a Place"
 "Landslide"
 "Tusk"
 "Angel"
 "You Make Loving Fun"
 "I'm So Afraid"
 "World Turning"
 "Go Your Own Way"
 "Sisters Of The Moon"
 "Blue Letter"
 "Songbird"

North American leg 1979 #3
 "Say You Love Me"
 "The Chain"
 "Don't Stop"
 "Dreams"
 "Oh Well"
 "Rhiannon"
 "Oh Daddy"
 "What Makes You Think You're The One"
 "Sara"
 "Not That Funny"
 "Save Me a Place"
 "Landslide"
 "Tusk"
 "Angel"
 "You Make Loving Fun"
 "I'm So Afraid"
 "World Turning"
 "Blue Letter"
 "Go Your Own Way"
 "Sisters Of The Moon"
 "Second Hand News"
 "Songbird"

Japan, Oceania, Second North American leg
 "Say You Love Me"
 "The Chain"
 "Don't Stop"
 "Dreams"
 "Oh Well"
 "Rhiannon"
 "Oh Daddy"
 "What Makes You Think You're The One"
 "Sara"
 "Not That Funny"
 "Never Going Back Again"
 "Landslide"
 "Tusk"
 "Angel"
 "You Make Loving Fun"
 "I'm So Afraid"
 "World Turning"
 "Go Your Own Way"
 "Sisters Of The Moon"
 "Songbird"

European leg
 "Say You Love Me"
 "The Chain"
 "Don't Stop"
 "Dreams"
 "Oh Well"
 "Rhiannon"
 "Oh Daddy"
 "That's Enough For Me"
 "Sara"
 "Not That Funny"
 "Never Going Back Again"
 "Landslide"
 "Tusk"
 "Angel"
 "You Make Loving Fun"
 "I'm So Afraid"
 "World Turning"
 "Go Your Own Way"
 "Sisters Of The Moon"
 "Songbird"

North American leg 1979 #4
 "Monday Morning"
 "The Chain"
 "Don't Stop"
 "Dreams"
 "Oh Well"
 "Rhiannon"
 "Over and Over"
 "What Makes You Think You're The One"
 "Sara"
 "Not That Funny"
 "Never Going Back Again"
 "Landslide"
 "Tusk"
 "Think About Me"
 "I'm So Afraid"
 "Angel"
 "You Make Loving Fun"
 "World Turning"
 "Go Your Own Way"
 "Sisters Of The Moon"
 "Songbird"

"The Ledge" and "I Know I'm Not Wrong" were rehearsed before this tour, but it is unknown if they were performed.

Personnel
Mick Fleetwood – drums, cowbell, congas, gong, wind chimes, talking drum
John McVie – bass guitar
Christine McVie – Hammond organ, Yamaha CP-30, piano, accordion, acoustic guitar, maracas, vocals
Lindsey Buckingham – lead guitar, acoustic guitar, vocals
Stevie Nicks – vocals, tambourine, cowbell
Additional Personnel
Ray Lindsey – rhythm guitar on "Go Your Own Way" & "Second Hand News"
Jeffery Bova – keyboards on "Tusk"
Tony Todaro – percussion

References

1979 concert tours
1980 concert tours
Fleetwood Mac concert tours